The Niké Aréna is an indoor arena located in Prievidza, Slovakia. It is used as a sports arena, and is the current home of the Slovak basketball club BC Prievidza. The arena has place for 3,400 spectators. The arena is named after the company Niké.

References

Indoor arenas in Slovakia
Basketball venues in Slovakia
Sport in Trenčín Region
Prievidza District
Buildings and structures in Trenčín Region